This is a list of members of the American Association of State Colleges and Universities.

 Adams State University
 Alabama Agricultural and Mechanical University
 Alabama State University
 University of Alaska Anchorage
 University of Alaska Southeast
 Albany State University
 Alcorn State University
 Alfred State College
 Arizona Board of Regents
 University of Arkansas – Fort Smith
 University of Arkansas at Little Rock
 University of Arkansas at Monticello
 Arkansas State University
 Arkansas Tech University
 Athens State University
 Atlantic University College
 Auburn University at Montgomery
 Austin Peay State University
 Ball State University
 Baruch College
 Bemidji State University
 Black Hills State University
 Bloomsburg University of Pennsylvania
 Bluefield State College
 Bowie State University
 Bowling Green State University
 Bridgewater State University
 Brooklyn College
 Buffalo State College
 California Maritime Academy
 California Polytechnic State University
 California State Polytechnic University, Pomona
 California State University
 California State University San Marcos
 California State University, Bakersfield
 California State University, Channel Islands
 California State University, Chico
 California State University, Dominguez Hills
 California State University, East Bay
 California State University, Fresno
 California State University, Fullerton
 California State University, Long Beach
 California State University, Los Angeles
 California State University, Monterey Bay
 California State University, Northridge
 California State University, Sacramento
 California State University, San Bernardino
 California State University, Stanislaus
 California University of Pennsylvania
 Cameron University
 University of Central Arkansas
 Central Connecticut State University
 University of Central Florida
 Central Michigan University
 University of Central Missouri
 University of Central Oklahoma
 Central State University
 Central Washington University
 Chadron State College
 College of Charleston
 Cheyney University of Pennsylvania
 Chicago State University
 The Citadel, The Military College of South Carolina
 City College of New York
 City University of New York
 Clarion University of Pennsylvania
 Clayton State University
 Clemson University
 Cleveland State University
 Coastal Carolina University
 The College of New Jersey
 College of Staten Island
 Colorado Mesa University
 Colorado State University–Pueblo
 Columbus State University
 Concord University
 Connecticut State University System
 Coppin State University
 Dakota State University
 Dalton State College
 Delaware State University
 Delta State University
 Dickinson State University
 University of the District of Columbia
 East Carolina University
 East Central University
 East Stroudsburg University of Pennsylvania
 East Tennessee State University
 Eastern Connecticut State University
 Eastern Illinois University
 Eastern Kentucky University
 Eastern Michigan University
 Eastern New Mexico University
 Eastern Oregon University
 Eastern Washington University
 Elizabeth City State University
 Empire State College
 Emporia State University
 Fairmont State University
 Farmingdale State College
 Fayetteville State University
 Ferris State University
 Fitchburg State University
 Florida A&M University
 Florida Atlantic University
 Florida Gulf Coast University
 Fort Hays State University
 Fort Lewis College
 Fort Valley State University
 Framingham State University
 Francis Marion University
 Frederick Community College
 Frostburg State University
 George Mason University
 Georgia Board of Regents
 Georgia College & State University
 Georgia Southern University
 Georgia Southwestern State University
 Glenville State College
 Governors State University
 Grambling State University
 Grand Valley State University
 Great Falls College Montana State University
 University of Guam
 Harris–Stowe State University
 Helena College University of Montana
 Henderson State University
 University of Houston–Clear Lake
 University of Houston–Downtown
 University of Houston–Victoria
 Howard University
 Humboldt State University
 Hunter College
 University of Illinois at Springfield
 Illinois State University
 Indiana State University
 Indiana University – Purdue University Indianapolis
 Indiana University - Purdue University Columbus
 Indiana University East
 Indiana University Kokomo
 Indiana University Northwest
 Indiana University of Pennsylvania
 Indiana University South Bend
 Indiana University Southeast
 Jackson State University
 Jacksonville State University
 James Madison University
 John Jay College of Criminal Justice
 Johnson State College
 Keene State College
 Kennesaw State University
 Kent State University at Stark
 Kentucky State University
 Kutztown University of Pennsylvania
 Lake Superior State University
 Lander University
 Lehman College
 Lewis–Clark State College
 Lincoln University (Missouri)
 Lock Haven University of Pennsylvania
 Longwood University
 University of Louisiana at Lafayette
 University of Louisiana at Monroe
 Louisiana Board of Regents
 Louisiana State University in Shreveport
 Louisiana Tech University
 Lyndon State College
 University of Maine at Machias
 McNeese State University
 Macon State College
 University of Maine at Augusta
 University of Maine at Farmington
 University of Maine at Fort Kent
 University of Maine at Presque Isle
 Mansfield University of Pennsylvania
 University of Mary Washington
 University of Massachusetts Amherst
 University of Massachusetts Boston
 Massachusetts College of Liberal Arts
 University of Massachusetts Dartmouth
 Mayville State University
 Medgar Evers College
 University of Memphis
 Metropolitan State University
 Metropolitan State University of Denver
 Michigan Technological University
 University of Michigan–Dearborn
 University of Michigan–Flint
 Middle Tennessee State University
 Midwestern State University
 Millersville University of Pennsylvania
 Minnesota State Colleges and Universities System
 Minnesota State University Moorhead
 Minnesota State University, Mankato
 University of Minnesota Duluth
 Minot State University
 Mississippi University for Women
 Mississippi Valley State University
 Missouri Southern State University
 Missouri State University
 Missouri Western State University
 University of Missouri–St. Louis
 Montana State University Billings
 Montana State University–Northern
 Montana Tech of the University of Montana
 University of Montana Western
 Montclair State University
 University of Montevallo
 Morehead State University
 Morgan State University
 Murray State University
 University of Nebraska at Kearney
 Nebraska State College System
 Nevada State College
 University of Nevada, Las Vegas
 New College of Florida
 New Jersey City University
 New Mexico Highlands University
 Nicholls State University
 University of North Alabama
 North Carolina Agricultural and Technical State University
 University of North Carolina at Asheville
 University of North Carolina at Charlotte
 University of North Carolina at Pembroke
 North Dakota University System
 University of North Dakota
 University of North Florida
 University of North Texas
 Northeastern Illinois University
 Northeastern State University
 Northern Arizona University
 University of Northern Colorado
 Northern Illinois University
 University of Northern Iowa
 Northern Kentucky University
 Northern Michigan University
 Northern State University
 Northwest Missouri State University
 Northwestern Oklahoma State University
 Northwestern State University
 Oakland University
 Ohio State University, Newark Campus
 Oklahoma Panhandle State University
 Oklahoma State Regents for Higher Education
 Old Dominion University
 Oregon Institute of Technology
 Penn State Altoona
 Penn State Erie, The Behrend College
 Penn State Graduate School
 Penn State Harrisburg
 Pennsylvania State System of Higher Education
 Pennsylvania State University
 Peru State College
 Pittsburg State University
 University of Pittsburgh at Bradford
 University of Pittsburgh at Greensburg
 University of Pittsburgh at Johnstown
 State University of New York at Plattsburgh
 Plymouth State University
 Portland State University
 Prairie View A&M University
 University of Puerto Rico at Arecibo
 University of Puerto Rico at Bayamón
 University of Puerto Rico at Cayey
 University of Puerto Rico at Mayagüez
 University of Puerto Rico, Río Piedras Campus
 University of Puerto Rico
 State University of New York at Purchase
 Purdue University
 Purdue University Fort Wayne
 Purdue University Northwest
 Queens College, City University of New York
 Radford University
 Ramapo College
 Rhode Island College
 Rogers State University
 Rowan University
 Saginaw Valley State University
 St. Cloud State University
 Salem State University
 Salisbury University
 Sam Houston State University
 San Diego State University
 San Francisco State University
 San Jose State University
 Savannah State University
 Shawnee State University
 Shepherd University
 Shippensburg University of Pennsylvania
 Slippery Rock University of Pennsylvania
 Sonoma State University
 University of South Alabama
 South Carolina State University
 University of South Carolina Aiken
 University of South Carolina Beaufort
 University of South Carolina Upstate
 South Dakota Board of Regents
 South Dakota School of Mines and Technology
 University of South Dakota
 Southeast Missouri State University
 Southeastern Louisiana University
 Southeastern Oklahoma State University
 Southern Arkansas University
 Southern Connecticut State University
 Southern Illinois University
 Southern Illinois University Carbondale
 Southern Illinois University Edwardsville
 University of Southern Indiana
 University of Southern Maine
 University of Southern Mississippi
 Southern Oregon University
 Southern Polytechnic State University
 Southern University at New Orleans
 Southern Utah University
 Southwest Minnesota State University
 Southwestern Oklahoma State University
 State University of New York
 State University of New York at Brockport
 State University of New York at Cobleskill
 State University of New York at Cortland
 State University of New York at Fredonia
 State University of New York at New Paltz
 State University of New York at Old Westbury
 State University of New York at Oneonta
 State University of New York at Oswego
 State University of New York at Potsdam
 Stephen F. Austin State University
 Stockton University
 Sul Ross State University
 Tarleton State University
 Tennessee Board of Regents
 Tennessee State University
 Tennessee Technological University
 University of Tennessee at Chattanooga
 University of Tennessee at Martin
 Texas A&M International University
 Texas A&M University–Commerce
 Texas A&M University–Corpus Christi
 Texas A&M University–Kingsville
 Texas A&M University–Texarkana
 University of Texas at San Antonio
 Texas Southern University
 Texas State University
 Texas State University System
 Texas Woman's University
 University of Texas–Pan American
 Thomas Edison State College
 University of Toledo
 Towson University
 Troy University
 Truman State University
 University of Alaska System
 University of Arkansas System
 University of Hawaii
 University of Hawaii at Hilo
 University of Hawaii–West Oahu
 University of Louisiana System
 University of Maine System
 University of Maryland Eastern Shore
 University of Maryland Global Campus
 University of Maryland, Baltimore County
 University of Nebraska Omaha
 University of Nebraska system
 University of North Carolina at Greensboro
 University of North Carolina Wilmington
 North Georgia College & State University
 University of Puerto Rico at Carolina
 University of Puerto Rico at Humacao
 University of Science and Arts of Oklahoma
 University of Tennessee system
 University of Virginia's College at Wise
 University of West Florida
 University of Wisconsin System
 University of Wisconsin–Eau Claire
 University of Wisconsin–Green Bay
 University of Wisconsin–Oshkosh
 University of Wisconsin–Parkside
 University of Wisconsin–River Falls
 University of Wisconsin–Stout
 University of Wisconsin–Whitewater
 University System of Maryland
 University System of New Hampshire
 Utah System of Higher Education
 Utah Valley University
 Valdosta State University
 Valley City State University
 Vermont State Colleges
 University of the Virgin Islands
 Washburn University
 University of Washington Tacoma
 Wayne State College
 Weber State University
 University of West Alabama
 West Chester University of Pennsylvania
 University of West Georgia
 West Texas A&M University
 West Virginia State University
 Western Carolina University
 Western Connecticut State University
 Western Kentucky University
 Western New Mexico University
 Western Oregon University
 Western State Colorado University
 Western Washington University
 Westfield State University
 William Paterson University
 Winona State University
 Winthrop University
 University of Wisconsin–La Crosse
 University of Wisconsin–Platteville
 University of Wisconsin–Stevens Point
 University of Wisconsin–Superior
 Worcester State University
 York College, City University of New York

 list
American Association of State Colleges and Universities